Stachiewicz is a Polish surname, probably related to the Polish name of Stach or Stanislaus. Out of the people to bear this name, two are most notable as generals of the Polish Army:

Wacław Stachiewicz (1894–1973), Polish chief of staff during the Invasion of Poland of 1939
Julian Stachiewicz (1890–1934), Staff officer during the Polish-Bolshevik War

Polish-language surnames